Adalberto Machado (born 3 June 1964), simply known as Adalberto, is a Brazilian retired footballer who played as a left back.

Club career
A Flamengo youth graduate, Rio de Janeiro-born Adalberto was promoted to the first team in 1983, but spent his first year sidelined due to a leg break. He made his first team debut in a 0–0 draw against Guarani in the year's Campeonato Brasileiro Série A.

An immediate backup of Júnior, Adalberto scored his first goal in March 1984, netting the opener in a 3–0 home win against Brasil de Pelotas. When Júnior was sold to Torino, he became the first-choice and appeared regularly until the end of the year.

Adalberto started the 1985 campaign as an undisputed starter, scoring a brace in a 6–1 routing of rivals Botafogo. He subsequently struggled severely with injuries, which prompted to end his career at the age of just 24.

International career
Adalberto represented Brazil at under-20 and under-23 levels. He won the 1983 South American U-20 Championship and 1983 FIFA World Youth Championship, while also appearing in the 1983 Pan American Games.

Personal life
He is the father of Spanish international forward Rodrigo. Adalberto opened a football school in Vigo alongside 1994 FIFA World Cup winner Mazinho.

Honours

Club
Flamengo
 Campeonato Carioca: 1986, 1987, 1988
 Campeonato Brasileiro Série A: 1989
 Taça Guanabara: 1987

International
Brazil U20
South American Youth Football Championship: 1983
FIFA U-20 World Cup: 1983

References

External links

1964 births
Living people
Footballers from Rio de Janeiro (city)
Brazilian footballers
Association football defenders
Campeonato Brasileiro Série A players
CR Flamengo footballers
Brazil under-20 international footballers
Pan American Games silver medalists for Brazil
Medalists at the 1983 Pan American Games
Footballers at the 1983 Pan American Games
Pan American Games medalists in football